The tenth and final season of Adventure Time, an American animated television series created by Pendleton Ward, premiered on Cartoon Network on September 17, 2017, and ended on September 3, 2018, and was produced by Frederator Studios and Cartoon Network Studios. It follows the adventures of Finn (a human boy) and his best friend and adoptive brother Jake, a dog with magical powers to change shape and size at will. Finn and Jake live in the post-apocalyptic Land of Ooo, where they interact with the series' other main characters: Princess Bubblegum, The Ice King, Marceline the Vampire Queen, Lumpy Space Princess, BMO, and Flame Princess.

The season was storyboarded and written by Sam Alden, Graham Falk, Erik Fountain, Polly Guo, Tom Herpich, Seo Kim, Patrick McHale, Adam Muto, Hanna K. Nyström, Kent Osborne, Aleks Sennwald, Somvilay Xayaphone, and Steve Wolfhard. The season's multi-episode story arcs include Princess Bubblegum confronting her antagonistic Uncle Gumbald, Finn dealing with Fern's embrace of the dark side, and Betty trying to turn the Ice King back into Simon Petrikov.

The season began with "The Wild Hunt," which was seen by 0.77 million viewers (a decrease from the previous season's finale, "Three Buckets," which was viewed by 0.85 million). It ended with "Come Along with Me," a four-part episode that served as the series' initial finale. Critical reaction to the season was primarily positive. Furthermore, the episodes "Ring of Fire" and "Come Along with Me" were nominated for Primetime Creative Arts Emmy Awards in 2018 and 2019, respectively. A DVD set of the season was released on September 4, 2018.

Development

Concept
The series follows the adventures of Finn the Human (a boy) and his best friend Jake, a dog with magical powers to change shape and size at will. Finn and Jake live in the post-apocalyptic Land of Ooo, where they interact with the other major characters: Princess Bubblegum, the Ice King, Marceline the Vampire Queen, Lumpy Space Princess, BMO, and Flame Princess. Common storylines revolve around Finn and Jake discovering strange creatures, dealing with the antagonistic-but-misunderstood Ice King, and battling monsters to help others. The season's multi-episode story arcs include Princess Bubblegum confronting her antagonistic Uncle Gumbald, Finn dealing with Fern's embrace of the dark side, and Betty trying to turn the Ice King back into Simon Petrikov.

Production

On July 21, 2016, lead writer Kent Osborne posted an image on Twitter which suggested that Adventure Time had been renewed for another season. At the time, the season was intended to be the show's ninth. The season divisions were later rearranged by Cartoon Network, and "The Wild Hunt" became the first episode of season ten. According to series showrunner Adam Muto, the number of episodes ordered by the network as part of the season was substantially lower than it had been, leading the production crew to think "that if this wasn't the end, it was coming up soon." This season's episodes were produced similarly to those of previous seasons. Each episode began as simple two-to-three-page outline with necessary plot information. The rough outline was given to storyboard artists, who expanded it into a full storyboard. The episodes were designed and colored at Cartoon Network Studios in Burbank, California, and animated in South Korea by Rough Draft Korea and Saerom Animation.

Storyboard artists who worked on this season included Sam Alden, Polly Guo, Seo Kim, Somvilay Xayaphone, Steve Wolfhard, Tom Herpich, Graham Falk, Kent Osborne, Hanna K. Nyström, Aleks Sennwald, Erik Fountain, and Patrick McHale. Ghostshrimp, the series' former lead background designer, returned to work on the "final story arc of Adventure Time" proper. Although Ghostshrimp had retired from the show after the fourth season, he had returned to draw backgrounds for the seventh-season miniseries Stakes and the ninth-season episodes "Abstract", "Fionna and Cake and Fionna", and "Whispers". Former character designer, storyboard artist, and background designer Andy Ristaino returned as a revisionist for this season. Former storyboard artist Rebecca Sugar returned to contribute the song "Time Adventure" to the series finale.

Series conclusion

During the last few seasons of Adventure Time, there was talk at Cartoon Network about wrapping up the series. According to Olivia Olson, the discussion went on for a while, and "the ending of the show was getting stretched and stretched and stretched." About the decision to end the series, Cartoon Network executive vice president and chief content officer Rob Sorcher told the Los Angeles Times:

Adventure Time was playing less and less on Cartoon Network, yet we were moving towards a large volume of episodes. And I really began thinking, "[The end] can't come quickly as a sudden company decision; it needs to be a conversation over a period of time." And it did also strike me that if we don't wind this up soon, we're going to have a generation of fans graduate through the [television] demo[graphic that Cartoon Network targets], and we won't have completed a thought for them.

Cartoon Network ordered a reduced number of episodes for the show's tenth season, and the network announced on September 29, 2016, that the season would be its last. Asked in an interview with Skwigly about his feelings about the end of the series, Osborne said:

It's weird because I've never been on a show this long, and I don't think Cartoon Network has done a show with this many episodes—for the past few seasons, we've been surprised ... every time it gets picked up. And I think a lot of us were thinking in the back of our minds, "When is this going to end? Am I gonna be 80 and still writing this?!" It is sad, and everyone's kind of grieving, but it's hard to feel too bad about it because ... they have so many episodes in the bank that it's gonna play for another couple years.

He noted that Cartoon Network gave the writers "an opportunity to spend a lot of time thinking about the finale." According to writer Jack Pendarvis, storyline writing for the series ended in mid-November 2016 and the last storyline meeting was held on November 21. Osborne tweeted that the season's final script was pitched to storyboarders on November 28; the episode was pitched to the show's producers during the third week of December 2016. A number of voice actors, including Maria Bamford and Andy Milonakis, confirmed that voice recording for the season (and series) ended on January 31, 2017.

Regular production of the series ended with a November 16, 2017 wrap party hosted by Cartoon Network for cast and crew who had worked on the series since its beginning. The party featured a DJ booth shaped like Finn and Jake's tree fort, a live band, and Adventure Time-related food. Several crew members were hired for Cartoon Network's Summer Camp Island, created by Adventure Time storyline writer Julia Pott, after the latter's final season ended.

Cast
Voice actors for the season included Jeremy Shada (Finn the Human), John DiMaggio (Jake the Dog), Tom Kenny (The Ice King), Hynden Walch (Princess Bubblegum), and Olivia Olson (Marceline the Vampire Queen). Ward himself provides the voice for several minor characters, including Lumpy Space Princess. Former storyboard artist Niki Yang voiced sentient video-game console BMO in English and Jake's girlfriend, Lady Rainicorn, in Korean. Polly Lou Livingston, a friend of Pendleton Ward's mother Bettie, voiced the small elephant Tree Trunks. Jessica DiCicco voiced Flame Princess, Finn's ex-girlfriend and sovereign of the Fire Kingdom. Andy Milonakis voiced N.E.P.T.R., a sentient robot who makes (and throws) pies. The Lich, the series' principal antagonist, is voiced in his demonic form by Ron Perlman. The Adventure Time cast recorded their lines as a group for more natural-sounding dialogue. Hynden Walch has described the group sessions as similar to "doing a play reading—a really, really out there play."

In addition to the regular cast members, episodes had guest voices by other actors, musicians, and artists. "The Wild Hunt," "Always BMO Closing," "Bonnibel Bubblegum," "Seventeen," "Gumbaldia," and "Come Along with Me" featured Fred Melamed voicing Princess Bubblegum's Uncle Gumbald. In "The Wild Hunt", Jenny Slate reprised her role as Huntress Wizard. "Son of Rap Bear" saw Dumbfoundead voicing the titular character; Rekstizzy voiced Rap Bear, Keith David reprised his role as Flame King, Paul Scheer reprised his role as Toronto, and Open Mike Eagle voiced a gingerbread man. Livvy Stubenrauch voiced the younger Princess Bubblegum in "Bonnibel Bubblegum", and former supervising director Andres Salaff reprised his role as Neddy.

Brad Neely voiced the Green Knight in "Seventeen" and "Gumbaldia". "Ring of Fire" featured David Herman as Randy, Raza Jaffrey as Danny, and Andy Daly as Wyatt. Martin Olson reprised his role as Hunson Abadeer, Marceline's father, in "Marcy & Hunson". In "The First Investigation", Marc Evan Jackson reprised his role as Kim Kil Whan and Dave Foley voiced Warren Ampersand; Foley reprised his role in "Jake the Starchild". In "Temple of Mars", Felicia Day reprised her role as Betty; the episode also saw the return of Tom Scharpling as Jermaine the dog. Day and Scharpling returned in the series finale, "Come Along with Me", which also featured Willow Smith as Beth the Pup Princess, Sean Giambrone as Shermy, Bettie Ward as a dream poodle, Jill Talley as Maja, and Ashley Eriksson as the music hole. Other characters were voiced during the season by Dee Bradley Baker, Maria Bamford, Steve Little, and Melissa Villaseñor.

Broadcast and reception

Episode "bombs"
Much like the sixth, seventh, eighth, and ninth seasons, the tenth season of Adventure Time featured several episode "bombs" in which several episodes premiered over a relatively-short time. The first occurred on September 17, 2017, when "The Wild Hunt", "Always BMO Closing", "Son of Rap Bear", and "Bonnibel Bubblegum" aired. The second was December 17, 2017 when "Seventeen", "Ring of Fire", "Marcy and Hunson" and "The First Investigation" aired. The third was March 18, 2018, when "Blenanas", "Jake the Starchild", "Temple of Mars", and "Gumbaldia" aired.

Ratings

The tenth season of Adventure Time had its television premiere on September 17, 2017, with "The Wild Hunt" episode bomb. It was watched by 0.77 million viewers and scored a 0.24 Nielsen rating in the 18-to- 49-year-old demographic. Nielsen ratings are audience measurement systems which determine the audience size and composition of television programming in the United States, and the episodes were seen by 0.24 percent of all households aged 18 to 49. This was a decrease compared with the season-nine finale, "Three Buckets" (seen by 0.85 million viewers), but an increase from the previous season's premiere, "Orb" (which was viewed by 0.71 million). The season and series itself ended with "Come Along with Me" on September 3, 2018. The four-part finale was viewed by 0.921 million viewers, and scored a 0.25 Nielsen rating in the 18- to 49-year-old demographic. The special was the twenty-fifth most-watched cable program on the day of its airing.

Reviews and accolades

During this season, Entertainment Weekly named Adventure Time the tenth-best series of 2018: "All the episodes [that aired in 2018] shined with Adventure Times eccentric trademarks: sweet fairy-tale logic, twisted dark humor, full-blown cosmic adventure, an ability to create and puncture myths in under 11 minutes." Entertainment Weekly argued that the finale was one of the "Best TV episodes of 2018", writing: "'Come Along with Me' is equal parts silly and sad, with music playing a major role. In other words, it's everything we loved about Adventure Time." At the 70th Primetime Creative Arts Emmy Awards in July 2018, "Ring of Fire" was nominated for a Primetime Creative Arts Emmy for Outstanding Short-format Animated Program. At the 71st Primetime Creative Arts Emmy Awards, "Come Along with Me" was nominated for a Primetime Creative Arts Emmy for Outstanding Animated Program, making it the series' first nomination in this category.

Episodes

Home media

US release

A DVD set including seasons eight, nine and ten was released on September 4, 2018.

Australian release

On February 20, 2019, the tenth season was released on DVD and Blu-ray in Australia.

See also

 Adventure Time: Distant Lands
 Adventure Time: Fionna and Cake

Notes

References

2017 American television seasons
2018 American television seasons
Adventure Time seasons